Sarah Hawkins Warren (born  1981/1982) is an American lawyer and judge serving as an associate justice of the Supreme Court of Georgia since 2018. She was appointed by Georgia Governor Nathan Deal on August 22, 2018, to fill the vacancy created when Britt Grant was appointed to the United States Court of Appeals for the Eleventh Circuit. Warren was sworn in by Gov. Deal and assumed her seat on the Court on September 17, 2018.

Warren graduated from Westminster Schools, then received a bachelor's degree from Duke University and her Juris Doctor degree from Duke University School of Law. She served as a law clerk to Judge Richard J. Leon of the U.S. District Court for the District of Columbia and for Judge J.L. Edmondson of the U.S. Court of Appeals for the 11th Circuit.

She became a partner at the law firm Kirkland & Ellis, based in the Washington, D.C. office, where she represented the State of Georgia in Florida v. Georgia (2018), a United States Supreme Court original jurisdiction case that was part of the long-running dispute over the flow of river water among those two states and Alabama.

Warren has also held several positions in Georgia's Office of the Attorney General.  Immediately before her judicial appointment, Warren served as the state Solicitor General from January 2017, a position in which she also succeeded Britt Grant.

Warren and her husband, Blaise Warren, have three children and reside in Atlanta.

Warren's political affiliation was rated to be "strong Republican" by Ballotpedia's 2021 study of state supreme court judges partisanship. This rating is based on past political affiliation, campaign involvement, and donations made to partisan candidates, but does not include an analysis of the judge's past decisions.

Supreme Court of Georgia
In the June 2020 election in Georgia, incumbent Justice Sarah Warren faced opposition to her Court seat from Hal Moroz. She was one of two justices facing opposition on the Court.  She retained her seat by a 79%-21% margin.

References 

1980s births
Living people
Place of birth missing (living people)
American women lawyers
Duke University alumni
Duke University School of Law alumni
Georgia (U.S. state) lawyers
People associated with Kirkland & Ellis
Solicitors General of Georgia
Justices of the Supreme Court of Georgia (U.S. state)
21st-century American women
21st-century American women judges
21st-century American judges